The 2020 season was the Detroit Lions' 91st in the National Football League (NFL) and their third and final season under head coach Matt Patricia. The Lions improved on their 3–12–1 record from the previous season, but were eliminated from playoff contention for the fourth consecutive year following their loss to the Tennessee Titans in Week 15. The Lions finished 5–11, and last place in the NFC North for the third consecutive season. Further, the 2020 Lions defense had one of the worst seasons in NFL history, setting franchise records for points allowed (519, 3rd worst in NFL history) and yards allowed (6,716, 3rd worst in NFL history) in a season, both marks topping the 2008 team.

On June 23, 2020, Detroit Lions' principal owner Martha Firestone Ford stepped down, passing ownership to her daughter Sheila Ford Hamp.

Following the Lions' Thanksgiving Day loss to the Houston Texans, both Patricia and general manager Bob Quinn were fired and offensive coordinator Darrell Bevell took over as interim head coach. Additionally, the Lions fired special teams coordinator Brayden Coombs on December 21.

Offseason

Coaching changes
On December 31, 2019, the Lions fired strength coach Harold Nash, special-teams coordinator John Bonamego, defensive backs coach Brian Stewart, linebackers coach Al Golden, tight ends coach Chris White and assistant strength coach Rodney Hill.
On January 2, 2020, defensive coordinator Paul Pasqualoni retired and offensive line coach Jeff Davidson took an "indefinite leave" from coaching.
On January 13, the Lions hired Cory Undlin as defensive coordinator.

Additions

Departures

Re-signings

Trades
On March 18, the Lions acquired safety Duron Harmon and a seventh-round pick from the New England Patriots in exchange for a fifth-round pick in the 2020 NFL Draft.
On March 19, the Lions traded cornerback Darius Slay to the Philadelphia Eagles in exchange for a third-round pick and a fifth-round pick in the 2020 NFL Draft.
On October 27, the Lions acquired defensive end Everson Griffen from the Dallas Cowboys in exchange for a conditional sixth-round draft pick in the 2021 NFL Draft.

Draft

Notes
The Indianapolis Colts traded a third and sixth-round selection (75th and 197th) to Detroit in exchange for a third, fifth, and sixth-round selection (85th, 149th, 182nd).
The Lions traded their fourth-round selection (109th) to the Las Vegas Raiders in exchange for a fourth and fifth-round selection (121st and 172nd).
On August 23, 2018, the Lions traded a conditional seventh-round selection to the San Francisco 49ers in exchange for linebacker Eli Harold.
On October 22, 2019, the Lions traded safety Quandre Diggs and a seventh-round pick in the 2021 NFL Draft to the Seattle Seahawks in exchange for a fifth-round pick in the 2020 NFL Draft.

Impact of the COVID-19 pandemic
The COVID-19 pandemic caused the preseason to be cancelled.

On July 29, the Lions placed five players, including wide receiver Kenny Golladay and tight end T. J. Hockenson, on the COVID-19 reserve list. The following day, two more players, including cornerback Justin Coleman, were placed on the list. On August 1, the Lions placed quarterback Matthew Stafford on the list. Three days later, however, Stafford's test was confirmed to be a false positive and he was removed from the list.

Most games this season were played behind closed doors, with crowds at some stadiums limited to friends and families of the players, coaches, and staff members.

Several members of the Lions coaching staff, including interim head coach Darrell Bevell, had to quarantine during the week 16 game against the Tampa Bay Buccaneers due to an outbreak.

Staff
Following the Lions' Thanksgiving Day loss to the Houston Texans, both Patricia and general manager Bob Quinn were relieved of their duties with offensive coordinator Darrell Bevell taking over as interim head coach. Additionally, the Lions fired special teams coordinator Brayden Coombs on December 21. Due to Coronavirus restrictions, Robert Prince was the acting head coach when the team faced the Tampa Bay Buccaneers.

Final roster

Preseason
The Lions' preseason schedule was announced on May 7, but was later cancelled due to the COVID-19 pandemic.

Regular season

Schedule

Note: Intra-division opponents are in bold text.

Game summaries

Week 1: vs. Chicago Bears

The Lions began their season by hosting their divisional rival, the Chicago Bears. Detroit opened the scoring in the first quarter via a 27-yard field goal by Matt Prater. The Bears got on the board in the second quarter via a 35-yard field goal by Cairo Santos to tie the game. The teams exchanged field goals, first a 32-yard field goal by Prater, then a 28-yard field goal by Santos. The Lions responded with a one-yard touchdown run from D'Andre Swift, making the score 13–6 in favor of Detroit at half-time. The Lions extended their lead in the third quarter via a four-yard touchdown pass from Matthew Stafford to T. J. Hockenson and a 44-yard field goal by Prater. The Bears responded with 21-unanswered points in the fourth quarter via a two-yard touchdown pass from Mitchell Trubisky to Jimmy Graham, a one-yard touchdown pass from Trubisky to Javon Wims and a 27-yard touchdown pass from Trubisky to Anthony Miller. The Lions' attempted comeback failed when Swift dropped the go-ahead touchdown with 11 seconds remaining in the game, making the final score 27–23 in favor of Chicago. This was the Lions' 10th consecutive loss dating back to Week 9 of last season. It also marks the team's fifth straight loss to Chicago. Jamie Collins, one of the Lions' linebackers got ejected for contacting a referee.

Week 2: at Green Bay Packers

In week 2, the Lions visited their divisional rival, the Green Bay Packers. The Lions opened the scoring in the first quarter via a one-yard touchdown run from Kerryon Johnson. The Packers responded with a 43-yard field goal by Mason Crosby. The Lions extended their lead via a four-yard touchdown pass from Matthew Stafford to Marvin Jones. The Packers scored 14 points in the second quarter via a seven-yard touchdown pass from Aaron Rodgers to Aaron Jones and an 11-yard touchdown pass from Rodgers to Robert Tonyan, making the score 17–14 in favor of Green Bay at half-time. The Packers scored 17 points in the third quarter via a 75-yard touchdown run from Jones, a seven-yard interception return by Chandon Sullivan, and a 35-yard field goal by Crosby. The teams exchanged touchdowns in the fourth quarter, first a 24-yard touchdown pass from Stafford to Marvin Hall, then a 14-yard touchdown run from Jones, and a two-point conversion run by Jamaal Williams, making the final score 42–21 in favor of Green Bay. This was the Lions' 11th consecutive loss dating back to Week 9 of last season.

Week 3: at Arizona Cardinals

In week 3, the Lions visited the 2–0 Arizona Cardinals. The Lions opened the scoring in the first quarter via a 37-yard field goal by Matt Prater. The Cardinals responded with a 13-yard touchdown pass from Kyler Murray to Andy Isabella. The Lions took the lead in the second quarter via a five-yard touchdown pass from Matthew Stafford to Jesse James. The Cardinals responded with a one-yard touchdown run from Murray followed by a failed point-after conversion to take a 13–10 lead. The Lions closed the quarter with a 15-yard touchdown pass from Stafford to Kenny Golladay, making the score 17–13 in favor of Detroit at half-time. The teams exchanged field goals in the third quarter, first a 54-yard field goal by Zane Gonzalez, then a 24-yard field goal by Prater. The Cardinals responded with a four-yard touchdown pass from Murray to Isabella to regain the lead, 23–20. Prater kicked two field goals in the final quarter: first one from 35 yards to tie the game, then one from 39 yards as time expired, making the final score 26–23 in favor of Detroit. With the win, the Lions snapped an 11-game losing streak dating back to week 8 of last season.

Week 4: vs. New Orleans Saints

In week 4, the Lions hosted the New Orleans Saints. The Lions scored 14 points in the first quarter via a seven-yard touchdown pass from Matthew Stafford to D'Andre Swift, and a 15-yard touchdown pass from Stafford to Kenny Golladay. The Saints responded with a three-yard touchdown run from Latavius Murray. The Saints scored 21 points in the second quarter via a one-yard touchdown run from Alvin Kamara, and two touchdown passes from Drew Brees to Tre'Quan Smith, from two-yards and 20-yards, respectively, making the score 28–14 in favor of New Orleans at half-time. The Saints extended their lead in the third quarter via a six-yard touchdown run from Murray. The Lions responded with a one-yard touchdown pass from Stafford to T. J. Hockenson. The Lions scored the only points of the fourth quarter via a five-yard touchdown run from Adrian Peterson and a two-point conversion pass from Stafford to Hockenson, making the final score 35–29 in favor of New Orleans. They also dubiously have blown a double-digit lead in five consecutive losses dating back to last season.

Week 6: at Jacksonville Jaguars

Following their bye week, in week 6, the Lions visited the Jacksonville Jaguars. The Lions opened the scoring in the first quarter via a one-yard touchdown run from Adrian Peterson. The Jaguars responded with a 31-yard field goal by Jon Brown. The Lions scored 10 points in the second quarter via a one-yard touchdown run from D'Andre Swift and a 31-yard field goal by Matt Prater, making the score 17–3 in favor of Detroit at half-time. The Lions extended their lead in the third quarter via a one-yard touchdown pass from Matthew Stafford to T. J. Hockenson. The Jaguars responded with a six-yard touchdown run from Gardner Minshew. The Lions scored 10 points in the fourth quarter via a six-yard touchdown run from Swift and a 41-yard field goal by Prater. The Jaguars responded with a 14-yard touchdown pass from Minshew to James Robinson, making the final score 34–16 in favor of Detroit. Swift became the first rookie running back for the Lions to run for 100-plus yards and score two touchdowns in a game since Barry Sanders in 1989. Stafford has now thrown a touchdown pass against every NFL team (except his own).

Week 7: at Atlanta Falcons

In week 7, the Lions visited the Atlanta Falcons. The Lions opened the scoring in the first quarter via a three-yard touchdown run from D'Andre Swift. The Falcons added 14 points in the second quarter via a one-yard touchdown run from Todd Gurley and a four-yard touchdown pass from Matt Ryan to Calvin Ridley. The Lions responded with a 50-yard field goal by Matt Prater, making the score 14–10 in favor of Atlanta at half-time. The Lions scored the only points of the third quarter via a 51-yard field goal by Prater. In the fourth quarter, the Lions regained the lead via a 49-yard field goal by Prater. The Falcons made it all the way to the Detroit red zone and threatened to kick a game-winning field goal. However, Falcons running back Todd Gurley accidentally scored a touchdown, leaving over a minute for the Lions to respond. The Lions ended up scoring a walk-off touchdown from Matthew Stafford to T. J. Hockenson, with the help of a long PAT from Matt Prater, to win it 23–22.

Week 8: vs. Indianapolis Colts

In week 8, the Lions hosted the Indianapolis Colts. The Lions opened the scoring in the first quarter via a 25-yard touchdown pass from Matthew Stafford to Marvin Jones. The Colts scored 20 points in the second quarter via a 22-yard touchdown pass from Philip Rivers to Nyheim Hines, a seven-yard touchdown pass from Rivers to Jack Doyle, and a 29-yard touchdown pass from Rivers to Hines, making the score 20–7 in favor of Indianapolis at half-time. The Lions scored the only points of the third quarter via a nine-yard touchdown pass from Stafford to Kerryon Johnson. The Colts scored 21 points in the fourth quarter via a one-yard touchdown run from Jordan Wilkins, and two-point conversion run by Wilkins, a 29-yard interception return by Kenny Moore, and a two-yard touchdown run from Trey Burton. The Lions responded with a four-yard touchdown pass from Stafford to Jones, making the final score 41–21 in favor of Indianapolis.

Week 9: at Minnesota Vikings

In week 9, the Lions visited their divisional rival, the Minnesota Vikings. The Vikings scored 13 points in the first quarter via a five-yard touchdown run from Dalvin Cook and a nine-yard touchdown pass from Kirk Cousins to Irv Smith Jr. (This marked the first game of the 2020 season in which the Lions did not score first.) The Lions scored ten points in the second quarter via a 23-yard field goal by Matt Prater and a 15-yard touchdown pass from Matthew Stafford to Marvin Jones. The Vikings responded with a 22-yard touchdown pass from Cousins to Ameer Abdullah, making the score 20–10 in favor of Minnesota at half-time. The Vikings scored the only points of the third quarter via a one-yard touchdown pass from Cousins to Smith Jr. The Lions attempted comeback failed with interceptions on consecutive possessions in the third quarter. Stafford exited the game in the fourth quarter due to concussion protocol. The Lions scored 10 points in the fourth quarter via a 45-yard field goal by Prater and a two-yard touchdown pass from Chase Daniel to T. J. Hockenson. The Vikings responded with a 70-yard touchdown run from Cook, making the final score 34–20 in favor of Minnesota.

Week 10: vs. Washington Football Team

In week 10, the Lions hosted the Washington Football Team. Detroit opened the scoring in the first quarter via a 55-yard touchdown pass from Matthew Stafford to Marvin Hall. Washington responded with a 38-yard field goal by Dustin Hopkins, their only points of the first half. Detroit added 10 points in the second quarter, via a 27-yard touchdown pass from Stafford to Marvin Jones and a 53-yard field goal by Matt Prater, making the score 17–3 in favor of Detroit at half-time. The teams exchanged touchdowns in the third quarter, first a 15-yard touchdown pass from Staffford to D'Andre Swift for Detroit, then a two-yard touchdown run from J. D. McKissic for Washington. In the fourth quarter, Washington's Antonio Gibson scored back-to-back touchdowns, from two and five-yards, respectively, to tie the score at 24 points. Detroit responded with a 37-yard field goal by Prater to regain the lead. Washington responded with a 41-yard field goal by Hopkins, to tie the score again at 27 points each. Detroit responded with a 59-yard game-winning field goal by Prater as time expired, making the final score 30–27 in favor of Detroit, for their first home win of the season.

Week 11: at Carolina Panthers

In week 11, the Lions visited the Carolina Panthers. The Panthers opened the scoring in the first quarter via a one-yard touchdown run from Mike Davis. After a scoreless second quarter, the Panthers added 10 points in the third quarter via a 17-yard touchdown pass from P. J. Walker to Curtis Samuel and a 58-yard field goal by Joey Slye. The Panthers extended their lead in the fourth quarter via a 37-yard field goal by Slye, making the final score 20–0 in favor of Carolina. The Lions were shut out for the first time since week 6 of 2009.

Week 12: vs. Houston Texans

For their annual Thanksgiving Day game, the Lions donned throwback uniforms and hosted the Houston Texans. The Lions opened the scoring in the first quarter via a one-yard touchdown run from Adrian Peterson. The Texans responded with a 19-yard interception return by J. J. Watt and a two-yard touchdown pass from Deshaun Watson to C. J. Prosise. In the second quarter, Detroit regained the lead via a one-yard touchdown run from Peterson. Houston responded with 10 points via a 33-yard touchdown pass from Watson to Duke Johnson and a 42-yard field goal by Kaʻimi Fairbairn, making the score 23–14 in favor of Houston at half-time. In the third quarter, the teams exchanged field goals, first a 29-yarder by Matt Prater for Detroit, then a 26-yarder by Fairbairn for Houston. In the fourth quarter, Will Fuller of the Texans scored back-to-back touchdown receptions, from 40 and 34 yards, respectively. Detroit scored the game's final points via a 14-yard touchdown pass from Matthew Stafford to Mohamed Sanu and a two-point conversion pass from Stafford to Sanu, making the final score 41–25 in favor of the Texans. With the loss, the Lions fell to 4–7 and lost their fourth consecutive Thanksgiving Day game. Two days after the game, both head coach Matt Patricia and general manager Bob Quinn were fired by the Lions.

Week 13: at Chicago Bears

In week 13, the Lions visited their divisional rivals, the Chicago Bears, for a rematch of week 1, in Darrell Bevell's debut as interim head coach. The Bears scored nine points in the first quarter via a 45-yard field goal by Cairo Santos and a 13-yard touchdown run from David Montgomery. The Lions responded with a three-yard touchdown run from Adrian Peterson. The teams exchanged touchdowns in the second quarter via a five-yard touchdown run from Cordarrelle Patterson for the Bears and a 49-yard touchdown pass from Matthew Stafford to Quintez Cephus for the Lions. The Bears extended their lead via a four-yard touchdown run from Montgomery, making the score 23–13 in favor of Chicago at half-time. The Lions scored the only points of the third quarter via a nine-yard touchdown pass from Stafford to Jesse James. The Bears extended their lead in the fourth quarter via an 11-yard touchdown pass from Mitchell Trubisky to Cole Kmet. The Lions responded with a 25-yard touchdown pass from Stafford to Marvin Jones. With under two minutes left in the game, Trubisky was sacked by Romeo Okwara at the Bears nine-yard line, causing a fumble that was recovered by Detroit's John Penisini. On the ensuing possession, the Lions scored via a five-yard touchdown run from Peterson. The Lions' defense held off the Bears on the next possession, making the final score 34–30 in favor of Detroit. With the win, the Lions snapped a five-game losing streak to the Bears dating back to week 11 of 2017. This would also be their last win until week 13 of the 2021 season, 364 days later.

Week 14: vs. Green Bay Packers

In week 14, the Lions hosted their divisional rivals, the Green Bay Packers, for a rematch of week 2. The Lions opened the scoring in the first quarter via a one-yard touchdown pass from Matthew Stafford to T. J. Hockenson. The Packers responded with a 56-yard touchdown pass from Aaron Rodgers to Davante Adams to tie the game. In the second quarter the Packers scored via a 14-yard touchdown pass from Rodgers to Marquez Valdes-Scantling, to take their first lead of the game. The Lions responded with a three-yard touchdown run from D'Andre Swift, tying the score at 14–14 at half-time. The Packers scored the only points of the third quarter via a six-yard touchdown run from Rodgers. The Packers extended their lead in the fourth quarter via a four-yard touchdown pass from Rodgers to Robert Tonyan. The Lions responded with a two-yard touchdown run from Kerryon Johnson. The teams then exchanged field goals, first a 57-yard field goal by Mason Crosby for the Packers, then a 32-yard field goal by Matt Prater for the Lions, making the final score 31–24 in favor of Green Bay.

Week 15: at Tennessee Titans

In week 15, the Lions visited the Tennessee Titans, who they had not beaten since 1995 when the latter was known as the Houston Oilers. The Titans opened the scoring in the first quarter via a three-yard touchdown run from Derrick Henry. The Lions responded with a two-yard touchdown pass from Matthew Stafford to Marvin Jones to tie the game. The Titans regained the lead via a 75-yard touchdown pass from Ryan Tannehill to Corey Davis. The Titans extended their lead in the second quarter via a 17-yard touchdown run from Tannehill. The Lions responded with nine points via a Romeo Okwara safety and a two-yard touchdown run from D'Andre Swift. The Titans responded with a 38-yard field goal by Stephen Gostkowski, making the score 24–15 in favor of Tennessee at half-time. The Lions scored the only points of the third quarter via a 53-yard field goal by Matt Prater. In the fourth quarter, the Titans extended their lead via a three-yard touchdown run from Tannehill and a two-point conversion run by Henry, and a two-yard touchdown pass from Tannehill to A. J. Brown. The Lions responded with a six-yard touchdown run from Swift. The Titans scored the final points of the game via a three-yard touchdown pass from Tannehill to Darrynton Evans, making the final score 46–25 in favor of Tennessee. With the loss, the Lions were eliminated from playoff contention.

Week 16: vs. Tampa Bay Buccaneers

In week 16, the Lions hosted the Tampa Bay Buccaneers. Several members of the Lions coaching staff had to quarantine per NFL rules due to COVID-19 contact tracing. Wide receivers coach Robert Prince filled in for interim head coach Darrell Bevell. The Buccaneers scored 34 unanswered points in the first half. They scored 13 points in the first quarter via a 33-yard touchdown pass from Tom Brady to Rob Gronkowski and a 27-yard touchdown pass from Brady to Mike Evans. The Buccaneers added 21 points in the second quarter, first via a four-yard touchdown run from Leonard Fournette, then touchdown passes from Brady to Chris Godwin and Antonio Brown, from seven and 12-yards, respectively, making the score 34–0 in favor of Tampa Bay at half-time. In the third quarter, the Buccaneers extended their lead via a 25 yard-touchdown pass from Blaine Gabbert to Gronkowski. The Lions finally got on the board via a 74-yard punt return by Jamal Agnew. The Buccaneers scored the game's final points via a 22-yard touchdown pass from Gabbert to Evans, making the final score 47–7 in favor of Tampa Bay.

Week 17: vs. Minnesota Vikings

To finish the season, the Lions hosted their divisional rivals the Minnesota Vikings for a rematch of week 9. The Lions opened the scoring in the first quarter via a 43-yard touchdown pass from Matthew Stafford to Marvin Jones. The Vikings responded with a 28-yard touchdown pass from Kirk Cousins to Alexander Mattison. The teams exchanged touchdowns in the second quarter, via a 20-yard touchdown pass from Stafford to Quintez Cephus for the Lions, and a four-yard touchdown pass from Cousins to Ameer Abdullah for the Vikings. The Lions regained the lead via a 54-yard field goal by Matt Prater. The Vikings responded with a 40-yard touchdown pass from Cousins to Chad Beebe, making the score 21–16 in favor of Minnesota at half-time. The Lions regained the lead in the third quarter via a 26-yard touchdown pass from Stafford to Jones. The Vikings responded with 10 points via a two-yard touchdown run from Mattison and a 23-yard field goal by Dan Bailey. The Lions responded with a two-yard touchdown run from Adrian Peterson. The Vikings extended their lead in the fourth quarter via a one-yard touchdown run from Cousins. The Lions scored the final points of the game via a two-yard touchdown run from D'Andre Swift, making the final score 37–35 in favor of Minnesota. The Lions finished 5–11, and last place in the NFC North for the third consecutive season.

Standings

Division

Conference

References

External links
 

Detroit
Detroit Lions seasons
Detroit Lions